The 2021 Trophée des Champions was the 26th edition of the French super cup. The match was contested by the 2020–21 Ligue 1 champions, Lille, and the 2020–21 Coupe de France winners, Paris Saint-Germain, and took place at Bloomfield Stadium in Tel Aviv, Israel on 1 August 2021.

Lille won the match 1–0 for their first Trophée des Champions, ending PSG's run of eight consecutive titles.

Host selection 
On 11 March 2021, the Ligue de Football Professionnel decided that the match would take place at the Bloomfield Stadium in Tel Aviv. The fixture was scheduled for 1 August 2021.

Match

Summary
In the 45th minute, Xeka scored the only goal of the game for Lille with a powerful right foot shot to the right corner of the net from outside the penalty area.

Details

Notes

References

External links 
  (in French)

Trophée des Champions
Lille OSC matches
Paris Saint-Germain F.C. matches
2021–22 in French football
2020–21 in Israeli football
International club association football competitions hosted by Israel
Sport in Tel Aviv
Football, 2021 Trophée des Champions
August 2021 sports events in Asia